An  is a type of entertainer marketed for image, attractiveness, and personality in Japanese pop culture. Idols are primarily singers with training in acting, dancing, and modeling. Idols are commercialized through merchandise and endorsements by talent agencies, while maintaining a parasocial relationship with a financially loyal consumer fan base.

Japan's idol industry first emerged in the 1960s and became prominent in the 1970s and 1980s due to television. During the 1980s, regarded as the "Golden Age of Idols", idols drew in commercial interest and began appearing in commercials and television dramas. As more niche markets began to appear in the late 2000s and early 2010s, it led to a significant growth in the industry known as the "Idol Warring Period." Today, over 10,000 teenage girls in Japan are idols, with over 3,000 groups active. Japan's idol industry has been used as a model for other pop idol industries, such as K-pop.

Sub-categories of idols include gravure idols, junior idols, net idols, idol voice actors, virtual idols, AV idols, alternative idols, underground idols,  idols, local idols, bandols, and Japanese-Korean idols.

Definition

Roles and training

An idol is a type of entertainer whose image is manufactured to cultivate a dedicated consumer fan following. Talent agencies commercialize idols by recruiting preteens and teenagers with little or no experience in the entertainment industry, and market them as aspiring stars. Idols are marketed for their image, attractiveness, and personalities. An idol's main objective is to "sell dreams", offering fans a form of escapism from the troubles of daily life. Idols are predominantly singers, but are also often trained in acting, dancing, and modeling. This style of recruiting and training was pioneered by Johnny Kitagawa, the founder of Johnny & Associates, and has since been used in other pop idol industries such as Korean idols in K-pop.

Idols often spend time isolated from family and friends while enduring busy work schedules, with some agencies withholding job assignments from their talents and notifying them of work on short notice to prevent them from taking time off. Some talent agencies do not rigorously train their idols and market them as amateurs who will gain experience over the course of their careers and with support from their fans. Despite being trained in multiple roles in entertainment, idols in Japan are not expected to meet the high standards of performances that professionals in their fields do. Because of their manufactured image, idols are generally not regarded as authentic artists. Likewise, many young Japanese artists pursuing careers in acting or music reject the idol label in their bid to be seen as professionals.

Music from idol singers is generally categorized under J-pop, though talent agencies may label them under the sub-genre "idol pop" for further distinction. Many idol singers find success as groups rather than individually. Within each idol group, the members are sometimes given distinct roles. One example of a role is the center, who occupies the center position in the group's choreography and thus receives the most focus. Another example is the leader, usually relegated to the oldest or most experienced member in the group, who acts as an intermediary for the members and the staff.

Public image

Idols are seen as role models to the public, and their personal lives and image can sometimes be tightly controlled by their talent agencies. Common restrictions include not being allowed to smoke or drink in public, or pursue romantic relationships.

Outfits

Idols generally perform in elaborate costumes for specific performances. Costumes are created for each song in their promotion cycle, as well as graduation events, and some groups have their own in-house costume designer. AKB48, in particular, has had over 1,102 costumes created for the group since 2017. The outfits worn by female idols are generally described as "cute", while outfits worn by male idols are described as "cool."

Among many idol groups, school uniforms have been used as a standard costume. The integration of school uniforms in the idol industry originated from Onyanko Club, who debuted in 1985 with a concept based on school. When AKB48 debuted in 2006, the group used a school concept and the members have performed in various stylized school uniforms. Since then, other groups have used stylized school uniforms as costumes, such as AKB48's sister groups, Sakura Gakuin, and Sakurazaka46, with some modifications to suit the groups' image and choreography.

In 2017, Nihon Tarento Meikan noted that stylized school uniforms being used as costumes gained popularity through AKB48 due to their unique designs, the short skirts, and the neatness of the uniform. The uniforms found popularity with men, as they represent their "eternal longing" and nostalgia for high school, while only gaining popularity with women in the 2010s through anime.

Retirement

Idols are typically expected to change careers after aging out of the industry, with female idols typically changing careers at age 25 and male idols at ages 30–45. The term originated from the idol group Onyanko Club, as the group's youthful concept drew similarities to an after-school club, and the fact that Miharu Nakajima's final single before retirement was released around graduation season in Japan. Prior to the 1980s, the terms "retirement" and "disbandment" were used. "Graduation" saw usage again in the 1990s during the revival of idol groups when Tsunku, who produced the group Morning Musume, used the term as a euphemism regarding one of the members leaving the group. An idol having a "graduation" ceremony is seen more favorably than terminating a contract or voluntarily withdrawing, as the latter two terms are negatively connoted with scandals.

Sub-category markets
The diversity of Japan's idol industry has created several sub-category markets, each with a specific concept appealing to certain audiences.

 : AV (adult video) idols generally refer to pornographic actresses and models, with the industry first emerging in the 1980s.
 : Bandols are idol groups that play instruments and perform as bands. The term first emerged in the 2000s as a shortening of the phrase, which was used to describe the marketing concept of the band Zone.
 : Gravure idols are models who pose in provocative swimsuit and lingerie photographs in magazines and photo books marketed towards men, similar to pin-up models. In the 1970s, Agnes Lum, who rose to fame in Japan, is considered the first gravure idol despite the term not existing at the time. After Akiko Hinagata became a rising star in 1995, the term "gravure idol" was coined to describe her. In the 2000s, there was a significant growth in the gravure idol industry, with many women of different body types modeling. The gravure idol industry faced a decline in 2010 due to the popularity of AKB48, as some of their members also did gravure modeling; as a result, the demand for newer talents was reduced.

 : Since the 1970s, several voice actors of anime and video games also held successful singing careers in addition to voice acting. Early examples of voice actors who had an idol-like presence were Mobile Suit Gundam voice actors Toshio Furukawa and Toru Furuya in the 1970s, who gained a sizeable female following after forming their band, Slapstick. In the 1980s, idol singer Noriko Hidaka eventually became a voice actress after gaining recognition for playing lead in Touch. Beginning in the 1990s, several voice actors held successful concurrent singing careers alongside of voice acting, such as Hekiru Shiina, Mariko Kouda, and Megumi Hayashibara. As the anime industry began producing more late-night series in the 2000s, the term "idol voice actor" was popularized when more voice actors with a cultivated fan following began appearing on television. While previous examples involved voice actors who incidentally drew in fans through their singing careers or former idol singers who turned to voice acting, Yui Horie, Yukari Tamura, and Nana Mizuki were intentionally produced and marketed as idol voice actors by their record labels. Around the time when the Idol Warring Period was occurring during the mid-to-late 2000s, there was a significant boom in idols voice acting in anime, with Oricon naming Aya Hirano and Koharu Kusumi as examples, as both of them were established actresses and singers in mainstream Japanese entertainment before entering voice acting. Hirano, in particular, was strongly marketed as an idol at the height of her voice acting career, from the late 2000s to the early 2010s. While character song tie-ins were already common in the film industry by then, some voice actors also began making crossover television, stage, and concert appearances as their characters as well, leading them to be closely associated with one another.
 : While Japan and South Korea agencies have created collaborative idol groups in the past, with Route 0 in 2002, during the third Korean wave in the mid-to-late 2010s, the term saw usage again to refer to collaborative idol groups promoting primarily in Japan, but with music, styling, marketing, and presentation produced in the K-pop industry. The earliest example is Iz*One in 2018, followed by JO1 in 2019 and NiziU in 2020.

 : Male idols contracted to Johnny & Associates are nicknamed "Johnny's idols" by the media and include groups such as SMAP and Arashi, who have led strong careers both individually and as a group. Since the company was founded in 1962 by Johnny Kitagawa, who is credited for pioneering the idol trainee system and popularizing the performance aspect of modern idols, the company has held a monopoly over the male idol industry in Japan, with Kitagawa pressuring the media to reduce coverage on male idols from other companies until his death in 2019. Johnny's idols also rarely get negative press such as scandals due to Kitagawa's influence on the media.
 : Junior idols are singers and gravure models who generally are 15 years old and younger. In the 2000s, "chidol" saw fewer usage, and it was eventually replaced by the term "junior idol" to legitimize them as part of the idol industry as well as removing the focus on their age. While the industry is still considered legal in Japan, it has been criticized for sexual exploitation of minors. Many junior idol distributors closed after possession of child pornography was outlawed in Japan in 2014.

The emergence of local idols was traced back to the early 2000s with Perfume and Negicco. The "Idol Warring Period" in the 2010s led to an increase in the number of local idols, with the 2013 television drama Amachan inspiring an accelerated growth. Journalist Mamoru Onoda estimates there are approximately 2,000 local idols active as of 2021. Most of the local idol groups are independently managed, relying on popularity through word-of-mouth. Several local idol groups who have crossed into mainstream media in the 2010s are Rev. from DVL and Dorothy Little Happy, the former after a photo of then-member Kanna Hashimoto went viral on the Internet.
 : Net idols are Internet celebrities who emerged with the accessibility of the Internet in the 1990s, using self-made websites and blogs to discuss their daily lives. Net idols currently conduct the majority of their activities through video streaming websites and social media beginning in the 2000s.
 : Virtual idols are digital avatars representing a fictional character or persona. The first fictional idol gaining mainstream crossover Lynn Minmay from Macross in the 1980s. In 1997, Kyoko Date was created as the first virtual idol. In 2007, Crypton Future Media released Hatsune Miku as its latest addition to the Vocaloid software, who subsequently saw positive reception from amateur songwriters, with her character and music based on user-generated content. Virtual online streamer Kizuna AI, who first appeared in 2016, led to a boom of Virtual YouTubers who similarly conduct their activities through a digital avatar on YouTube and other streaming websites.

 : Underground idols are independently managed idols who perform at small venues. Tama Himeno and Kamen Joshi member Tomoka Igari, both underground idols, describe them as being different from mainstream idols (nicknamed ) in that underground idols are active through live performances rather than through exposure from mass media or CD releases through major record labels, thus making them more accessible to fans in comparison to mainstream idols. An example Igari used to describe close relationships that underground idols have with their fans is that underground idols will hold handshake events and take instant camera photos (known as ) with fans after every live performance.
 :  idols are type of underground idol based in the Akihabara district of Tokyo, drawing influences from its  culture. Music from  idols are generally sold as self-published CDs at Comiket or promoted through Niconico.  is a dedicated venue where they perform. While  idols are niche, Haruko Momoi and Dempagumi.inc are cited as an examples of an  idols crossing over to mainstream media. Dempagumi.inc's music producer, Maiko Fukushima, describes the music from  idols as distinct from anime songs, with most composers being "amateurs" and its organic music culture facing a state of the Galapagos syndrome, as they had no direct creative input from J-pop or other music genres. However, Fukushima noted that songs from R-18 games were also key components of  music. In 2007, Vocaloid greatly influenced the growth of  music and idol culture. AKB48, one of Japan's most recognized idol groups nationwide, originated from Akihabara, but it is not considered an  group.
 Alternative idols: Alternative idols, also known as alt-idols or anti-idols, is a term coined by English-speaking communities to describe idol singers that have an image concept and music different from what is considered mainstream, such as having darker images and alternative rock. The alternative idol scene was pioneered by Bis and Seiko Oomori and made popular by Bis' successor Bish.

History

1960–1980: Post-war era and idol beginnings

The popularity of young female singers can be traced back to Sayuri Yoshinaga in the 1960s, as well as the Takarazuka Revue and theater shows from the Meiji era. In 1962, Johnny Kitagawa founded Johnny & Associates and created the group Johnnys, which is retroactively considered the first idol group in Japan. He is also credited with pioneering the idol trainee system, where talents would be accepted in the agency at a young age and train not only in singing, but also dancing and acting, until they were ready for debut. However, the concept of an idol wasn't defined by mainstream Japanese media until in November 1964, when the 1963 French film Cherchez l'idole was released in Japan under the title . Many Japanese audiences took interest in Sylvie Vartan, whose song "La plus belle pour aller danser" from the film sold more than a million copies in Japan. Vartan was heralded for her youthful, adorable looks and musical talent, leading the Japanese entertainment industry to assign the word "idol" to singers who shared a similar aesthetic.

Television greatly impacted the popularity of the idol phenomenon, as beginning in the 1970s, many idols were recruited through audition programs. In addition, the availability of having home television sets gave audiences greater accessibility of seeing idols at any time compared to going to theaters. Momoe Yamaguchi, Junko Sakurada, Saori Minami, and Mari Amachi, some of the idols recruited through television, were some of the more popular figures of this era, along with groups such as Candies and Pink Lady. Saori Minami, who debuted in 1971, was noted by scholar Masayoshi Sakai to be the turning point of when teenage stars became popular in mainstream media. Music was produced by a shared climate of songwriters and art directors seeking a step towards a depoliticized youth culture. Idols grew in popularity over the 1970s, as they offered audiences escapism from political violence and radical student movements.

Idols at the time were seen as ephemeral because of how short-lived their careers were, and how they would disappear from the public after retirement. In public, idols took steps to play a distinct character and uphold an illusion of perfection, such as maintaining a virginal image. Other examples include being told not to use restrooms in public and answering interview questions about their favorite food with feminine-sounding answers such as "strawberries" and "shortcake."

1980–1990: Golden Age of Idols 

The influence idols had on television led the 1980s to be known as the "Golden Age of Idols", in part due to Japan's economic bubble and growing commercial interest in them. Several figures who defined the Golden Age of Idols are Seiko Matsuda, Akina Nakamori, Kyōko Koizumi, and Onyanko Club. Television programs in which idols appeared often enjoyed high viewer ratings. Dentsu also created the "CM idol" business model, where idols were able to gain fame by singing and appearing in commercials.

Onyanko Club, in particular, shifted public perception of idols from professional stars to ordinary schoolgirls who would gain experience throughout their career. They were also the first group to introduce a "graduation system", where older members would eventually leave the group while newer inexperienced members would join, with the system being named such as the group drew similarities to a school club. Onyanko Club also led to idols becoming closely associated with television, as the visual component became important to the overall enjoyment of their music.

At the same time, male idols gained popularity, with acts from Johnny & Associates normalizing idols singing and dancing at the same time. However, fewer male idol acts from other companies achieved the same success as Johnny's idols due to the company's CEO, Johnny Kitagawa, controlling the media and pressuring certain programs not to invite male idols from competing agencies, as he would continue to until his death in 2019.

1990–2000: Idol Winter Period and Chidol Boom

Around 1985, idols soon became unpopular after the public became disillusioned with the idol system. By the 1990s, public interest in idols began to wane, as audiences lost interest in singing and audition programs, particularly due to a shift in attitudes caused by Japan's economic collapse. The media coined the term  to describe the stagnation of the idol industry beginning in 1990.

More young people yielded aspirations to be defined as an artist instead of an idol. During this decline, public perception of idols again shifted from inexperienced amateurs to strong, independent women, in part due to a rehaul in Seiko Matsuda's public image. Namie Amuro, who gained fame as the lead singer of Super Monkey's, found popularity among young girls who emulated her appearance. At the same time, Speed also found a fan following. However, neither Amuro nor Speed referred to themselves under the idol label. Because of the lack of publicity over idols on television, many turned to the Internet.

Johnny & Associates observed the popularity of former Shibugakitai member Hirohide Yakumaru's success as an MC on variety shows, which prompted them to develop and market their current acts with distinct public personalities. Groups from the company began gaining more attention, drawing in fans from Hong Kong and Taiwan, and their marketing success led to many other idols doing the same.

In the mid-1990s, there was an increase in young idols in the elementary school age, which the media described as the "Chidol (child idol) Boom." The term "chidol" was coined by journalist Akio Nakamori in the magazine Weekly Spa! In the 2000s, "chidol" saw fewer usage, and it was eventually replaced by the term "junior idol" to legitimize them as part of the idol industry as well as removing the focus on their age.

2000–present: Media crossovers and Idol Warring Period

The 2000s saw the rise in popularity of idol groups again after Morning Musume's debut in 1997 and the formation of their musical collective, Hello! Project. Around the same time, there was an increase in gravure idols, who competed in magazine and photo book sales. In addition, anime voice actors, such as Yui Horie, Nana Mizuki, and Yukari Tamura, were also marketed as idols to promote both their activities and singing careers.

While idols briefly experienced another decline after 2002, AKB48 debuted in 2005 and later became known as nation's idol group. The public image of idols had diversified, with each idol group having a specific concept appealing to different audiences. To celebrate the diversity of idols, AKB48, Shoko Nakagawa, and Leah Dizon performed a medley called "Special Medley: Latest Japan Proud Culture" at the 58th Kohaku Uta Gassen in 2007, introduced as " idols" with each act described as a different sub-genre of idols.

The idol industry experienced a rapid growth in the beginning of the 2010s, and the media coined the nickname  to describe the phenomenon. Lawyer Kunitaka Kasai cited the Internet as a reason for the rapid growth of idols, as anyone can upload videos onto websites, and AKB48's business model encouraged this even further through creating more opportunities for fan interactivity. The 2013 television drama Amachan also inspired more idol groups to appear, the majority of them being "local idols" who performed in specific rural communities. Several independent idol groups also crossed over into mainstream, such as Dempagumi.inc, Dorothy Little Happy, and Rev. from DVL, the latter of which gained mainstream popularity after a photo of then-member Kanna Hashimoto went viral.

Since 2010, the biggest idol concert festival, Tokyo Idol Festival, has taken place. More than 200 idol groups and about 1500 idols performed, attracting more than 80,000 spectators in 2017. During 2014, about 486,000 people attended AKB48 and Momoiro Clover Z's live concerts, which was the highest record of all female musicians in Japan. Momoiro Clover Z has been ranked as the most popular female idol group from 2013 to 2017 according to surveys by The Nikkei, There were more than 10,000 teenage girls who performed as idols in Japan in 2017. In 2019, there were over 3,000 female idol groups.

In the early 2010s, alternative idols, a sub-category of Japanese idol came about. Pioneered by Bis and Seiko Oomori, alternative idols are known for mixing idol pop music with heavier genres such as alternative rock and heavy metal. They have also been known for utilising shock value to gain public and media attention and making use of a darker image than that of the idol scene norm.

From 2013 to 2018, boy band Arashi was ranked as the most popular artist overall in Japan according to Oricon polls of 20,000 people. Other male idols also found success as underground idols, as well as anime media mix projects and 2.5D musicals.

Beginning in the mid-to-late 2010s, the Japanese idol industry crossed over with K-pop with the third Korean wave in Japan, which was sparked partially from positive reception of the Japanese members of the South Korean group Twice. In the years that followed, several Japanese and South Korean companies collaborated to form K-pop influenced groups for a global consumer base, such as Iz*One, JO1, and NiziU.

Fan culture

Fan activities

During these events, the  perform , an organized sequence of fan chants and dancing to show appreciation for the idols. Fan chants where an idol's name is called after each bar is sung was popularized by Mari Amachi's fans in the 1970s, referencing her appearance in the 1971 television drama .

Because mainstream Japanese media exercises self-censorship over taboo, controversial subjects, fans are influential in circulating under-reported news through social media.

Idol fan culture has introduced several slang terms into the Japanese public, including:

The term has negative connotations. Writer Riyan suggests that while there are fans with no favorite members or groups, they are not likely to identify themselves as DD. A variation of DD is the word , which indicates support for an idol group.
 , a favorite member or group

Fan interactions

A notable trait of idols that sets them apart from typical celebrities is their relationship with fans, and they are marketed intentionally by talent agencies to have a high emotional connection with their consumer fan base. Fans are built as active supporters into the narrative of the idol's journey to become a professional entertainer, viewing them as siblings, daughters/sons, or girl/boy next door types due to how easily they can relate to the public. One documented example are fans of female idols, typically consisting of men from 30 to 40 years of age, who seek interactions with them as a way of having a long-term relationship without the prospect of supporting a family or dealing with awkwardness outside of a controlled environment.

Using idols from Johnny & Associates as an example, male idols appeal to female fans by representing a pseudo-romantic ideal for them. However, there are some female fans, particularly in Japan, who prefer to put themselves in the role of an external observer.

Fans spend money on merchandise and endorsed products to directly support their favorites, comparing it to spending money on "loved ones"; some express feeling happy that they were able to make someone they admired happy. Dedicated fans may give up their careers and devote their life savings to supporting and following their favorite members. To foster a closeness between idols and fans, some talent agencies offer meet-and-greets in the form of handshake events, where fans have the opportunity to shake hands, take a photograph, and speak briefly with the idols. AKB48's business model created more opportunities for fan interactions with their "idols you can meet" concept. An example of this are their elections, where fans can vote for their favorite member, thereby including the fans directly into the members' individual success. Because idols share an intimate relationship with their fans, fans may feel "betrayed" if idols reveal unfavorable parts of their personal lives that are different from the image they present, or break the illusion that they are there exclusively for fans.

Impact

Economic 

Idols often appear in advertising, with 50-70% of commercials in Japan featuring an idol. The "CM idol" business model, conceptualized by advertising agency Dentsu in the 1980s, uses idols' public image as a marketing asset. As the career of idols are dependent on their image, contracting offices create their image based upon trends in the market and with the intent of generating as much revenue as possible. Along with promoting products, commercials are also a cross-platform to promote idols at the same time by keeping both brand and idol product in the forefront of the consumers' minds. Pitches for commercials are often made with a specific idol who matches the company's image in mind. Idols contracted to particular brands are expected to uphold the brand's image and may not work for competing brands or networks; the agreement extends to magazine advertisements, online videos, and appearances in dramas. Idols may also provide the music or jingle for commercials. The idol industry makes approximately $1 billion a year.

Media 

Beginning in the 1980s, companies would compete to secure contracts for idols in dramas, which led to the current four-season television cour in Japan. Variety, talk, and music shows also became popular, in part for featuring idols as guests or the stars of the show.

Anime and video games 

The idol industry has crossed over to anime and video games. Using a media mix strategy, various multimedia projects have used fictional idols to market Japanese pop culture and  music. The series Creamy Mami, the Magic Angel was the first notable anime series to use a media mix marketing strategy, where Takako Ōta would provide the voice to the main character and portray her at music events; the series was used as a vehicle to launch her singing career. The first fictional idol to cross over to mainstream media is Lynn Minmay from Macross, whose 1984 single, "Ai Oboete Imasu ka", charted at #7 on the Oricon Weekly Singles Chart. In the late 2000s, Vocaloid software Hatsune Miku was received positively among amateur music producers, who used her as an avatar to perform their compositions, influencing  music.

In the early 2010s, idol-themed multimedia projects, such as Love Live!, The Idolmaster, and Uta no Prince-sama, became popular. Professor Marc Steinberg suggested that the popularity of idol-related media mix projects may stem from the managerial aspect found in life simulation games, with The Idolmaster being the first notable idol franchise to include this. These franchises set the fans in the active contributing role of the "producer" and regularly involved interactivity, as input made by the players were crucial to the idols' success. The growth of idol-related media mix projects in anime and video games was also seen as an attempt from the Japanese government to market Japanese pop culture overseas through the Cool Japan initiative. Music produced by voice actor idols and fictional idols have crossed over to mainstream music charts, with Billboard Japan launching the Billboard Japan Hot Animation Chart on December 1, 2010 exclusively for anime and video game music releases. Fictional idols have been treated like real-life celebrities. Idol-themed anime and video game series have been compared to the sports genre in anime due to a similar competitive nature and team-building the characters face, as well as being linked to the Odagiri effect for featuring attractive people of the same gender interacting with each other.

The idol fan culture is heavily tied to anime and manga, and most fans of anime are also fans of idols. The idea of "", which was popularized by anime, can be projected onto both idols and fictional characters, linking the two. Some may prefer fictional idols due to them never disbanding, leaving groups, or getting into scandals. A 2005 study by the Nomura Research Institute revealed that idol fans were the third largest group of  interests, following comics and anime.

In the late-2010s, the idol agency influenced the business model of VTuber agencies such as Hololive and Nijisanji—which focus on a mix of video game livestreaming, entertainment, and music.

Criticism

Working conditions

The idol system has been criticized for its strict rules, intense work schedules, and offering idols little control over their personal lives. The system has been likened to salarymen in Japan who are unable to disobey their employers. Labor rights activist Shohei Sakagura stated that idols get very little revenue and are ill-prepared for the work force after leaving their groups, as many of them spend their academic years learning poor job skills. In addition to this, Rob Schwartz from Billboard addressed that Japanese mainstream media outlets rarely bring attention to controversies and allegations of power harassment due to self-censorship on what they are allowed to write. Sasetsu Takeda of GQ Japan wrote that talent agencies dismiss idols regardless of their popularity, sometimes intentionally blocking job offers in order to pressure them to leave, all while declaring that they are "resting from illness" to the public. Independently managed idol groups offer even less protection, with idols given ambiguously-worded contracts that keep them in their companies for years, while offering almost no pay and compensation for transportation and costuming fees. Lawyer Kunitaka Kasai stated management may be poor, especially among independent idol groups, because they were established by people with a lack of experience to fill a demand for idols over the industry's growth.

Work schedules for idols have been criticized for being excessive, as idols are expected to work even when sick. Miki Gonobe from Nikkan Sports noted that idols generally do not have a labor union and agencies see no need for one, as they view idol activities akin to extracurricular activities at school. She voiced concerns about young girls becoming idols at an early age, especially elementary school students. In addition, Sasetsu Takeda of GQ Japan criticized some idol managements for intentionally preventing their talents from taking time off, mentioning it "strange" that idols are only notified of their assignments the night before. He also condemned the idol industry for not providing talents access to better mental health resources, as idols are often suspended or dismissed for publicly showing they are stressed out of concern that they may cause fans to feel worried or upset.

In March 2018, Ehime Girls member Honoka Omoto died by suicide, with her family launching a lawsuit against her talent agency in October 2018. In June 2018, a former member of Niji no Conquistador filed a lawsuit against Pixiv representative director, Hiroaki Nagata, and the group's management companies for voyeurism and sexual harassment during her time with the group, and Nagata filed a counter lawsuit for libel and resigned several days later. On February 10, 2020, the Tokyo District Court dismissed his claims and ordered him to pay  to the woman in damages.

Dating ban

Most idols are not allowed to form romantic relationships or must obtain permission from their agencies to get married. On the other hand, critics have suggested a dating ban is implemented in order to sell a fantasy of idols being accessible to their fans and disagreed with them for being inhumane. The Japan Times noted that aside from talent agencies, idol fan culture has contributed to this, especially with male fans of female idols; male fans buy into the idea of "", which fetishizes weakness and submissiveness while asserting "complete control" over the girls' sexual independence.

Several idols who were confirmed to have been dismissed, suspended, demoted, or forced to leave their groups following reports of them dating or having sexual relations include Mari Yaguchi, Ai Kago, Aya Hirano, Rino Sashihara, and Minami Minegishi. Minegishi, in particular, caught international media attention after her apology video went viral, causing international criticism over the management of her group, AKB48, as well as the Japanese idol industry. A talent agency filed a lawsuit against a 17-year-old former idol singer for accepting an invitation to a hotel room from two male fans, which had caused her group to disband within the first 3 months of their debut. In September 2015, Judge Akitomo Kojima, along with the Tokyo District Court, ruled in favor of the talent agency and fined the woman to pay , stating that the dating ban was necessary for idols to "win the support of male fans." In January 2016, a similar lawsuit filed with the Tokyo District Court ruled in favor of a 23-year-old former idol, with Judge Kazuya Hara stating that the dating ban "significantly restricts the freedom to pursue happiness."

Since handshake and other related events allow fans to be in close proximity with idols, critics also believe that marketing the idols' accessibility may cause fans to be unable to distinguish between fantasy and real life. Talent agencies have also been criticized over offering inadequate protection towards idols after several incidents of violent attacks on female idols such as the saw attack on Anna Iriyama and Rina Kawaei, the stabbing of Mayu Tomita, and the assault of Maho Yamaguchi.

Sexualization

Idols are often sexualized, especially female idols, some of whom also work as gravure idols and have suggestive swimsuit photo shoots that are published in magazines targeted towards adults. With the idol system commodifying youth, the industry is criticized for putting minors at risk, most particularly junior idols, who are aged 15 years and younger. Idol swimsuit photo books are often sold in the same sections as pornographic titles. In 1999, Japan banned production and distribution of sexually explicit depictions of minors, which outlawed photo books depicting nude junior idols. Multiple junior idol distributors closed after possession of child pornography was made illegal in Japan in 2014. However, junior idol content currently stands on legally ambiguous ground due to open interpretations of child pornography laws in Japan.

In 2017, through a survey conducted by the Japanese government, 53 out of 197 women contracted with talent agencies stated that they had been asked to take part in pornographic photo or video shoots of which were not previously disclosed nor included in their contracts. 17 of the women stated that they had performed the request anyway.

List of idols

See also

References

External links

Stock characters in anime and manga
Japanese popular culture
Japanese idols
Japanese youth culture